The 1937 South Sydney season was the 30th in the club's history. The club competed in the New South Wales Rugby Football League Premiership (NSWRFL), finishing the season 2nd.

The 1937 season only lasted 8 rounds due to the Kangaroos tour. No finals were played, and Eastern Suburbs were declared premiers. The second half of the season was occupied by a City Cup tournament.

Ladder

Fixtures

Regular season

City Cup

Club records 

Most Tries in a Match: 5 tries by Don Manson versus Sydney University on April 17, 1937

References

South Sydney Rabbitohs seasons
South Sydney season